Harold Hunt may refer to:
 H. Guy Hunt (1933–2009), American politician from Alabama
 Harold Hunt (coach) (1907–1992), American football coach for Southwestern College
 Harold Hunt (professor) (1903–1977), Australian classical scholar and educationist